Chereponi is a small town and is the capital of Chereponi district, a district in the North East Region of Ghana.

References 

Populated places in the North East Region (Ghana)